Julodis andreae is a species of beetles belonging to the Buprestidae family.

Subspecies
 Julodis andreae andreae (Olivier, 1790) 
 Julodis andreae derasa (Abeille, 1904) 
 Julodis andreae lineigera (Marseul, 1865) 
 Julodis andreae mandli (Pochon, 1967) 
 Julodis andreae obesa Obenberger, 1923 
 Julodis andreae obsoletesulcata Obenberger, 1917 
 Julodis andreae scovitzi (Steven, 1830) 
 Julodis andreae sulcata Redtenbacher, 1843 
 Julodis andreae xanthographa (Faldermann, 1830

Description
Colors of these metallic wood-boring beetles are very variable, ranging from iridescent blue, green, yellowish green and copper. These colors are not due to pigments but to physical iridescence. Elytra show strong longitudinal ridges with whitish hairs.

Distribution
This species can be found in Armenia, Syria, Iran and Turkey (South and Eastern Anatolia) .

References
 Biolib
 Julodis andreae
 Nature Wonders
 Atlas of Buprestidae of Russia

Buprestidae
Beetles described in 1790